The Egypt men's national field hockey team represents Egypt in international field hockey competitions.

Tournament history

Summer Olympics
 1992 – 12th
 2004 – 12th

Africa Cup of Nations
 1974 – 5th place
 1983 – 
 1989 – 
 1993 – 
 1996 – 
 2000 – 
 2005 – 
 2009 – 
 2013 – 
 2017 – 
 2022 –

All-Africa Games
 1987 – 4th place
 1991 – 
 1995 – 
 1999 – 
 2003 – 
 2023 – Qualified

African Olympic Qualifier
 2007 – 
 2011 – 
 2015 – 
 2019 –

Hockey World League
 2012–13 – 25th place
 2014–15 – 18th place
 2016–17 – 15th place

Champions Challenge
 2005 – 6th place

Sultan Azlan Shah Cup
 2009 – 5th place
 2010 – 7th place
 2022 – 5th place

Mediterranean Games
1955 – 
1963 – 
1979 – 5th place

See also
Egypt women's national field hockey team

References

External links
Official website
FIH profile

African men's national field hockey teams
National team
Field hockey